Rafał of Tarnów ( or ) was a Polish nobleman (szlachcic).

Rafał was the owner of Tarnów and Wielowieś estates and served as Podkomorzy of Sandomierz since 1355 and castellan of Wisnice since 1368.

He expanded his estates among others in Sandomierz Land, Wielowieś and Dzików.

He had one wife, Dzierżka of Wielowieś, and two children, Jan of Tarnów and Spytek of Tarnów.

14th-century births
1373 deaths
14th-century Polish nobility
Rafal of